Antonio Javier Pujol is an American college basketball coach, and the current head coach of the North Alabama Lions men's basketball team.

Playing career
Pujol played both basketball and baseball at Sterling College in Kansas, where he earned all-conference honors in baseball three-straight seasons.

Coaching career
Pujol's coaching career began in 1992 when he became the head boys basketball coach at La Progresiva Presbyterian HS in Miami, Florida. In 1995, Pujol accepted the head boys basketball coaching position at Northwest Christian Academy in Miami, where he stayed for 13 seasons and posted a 250-46 record, while winning state titles in 1999, 2003 and 2004. Pujol broke through in the college ranks as an assistant coach at Appalachian State in 2004 under Houston Fancher. He stayed for two seasons before joining Anthony Grant's staff at VCU from 2006 to 2009 where he was part of three Colonial Athletic Association regular season title squads and two CAA conference tournament title winners, including an upset win over Duke in the 2007 NCAA tournament.

After the 2009 season, Pujol followed Grant to join his staff at Alabama, where he stayed until 2014, as he took a year and a half off from coaching. Pujol returned to coaching in 2016, joining the staff at Wyoming under Allen Edwards.

On April 2, 2018 Pujol was named the seventh head coach in North Alabama history, and will be the first head coach in the Division I era as the school transitions to the ASUN Conference starting in 2018.

Head coaching record

College

References

Living people
Alabama Crimson Tide men's basketball coaches
American men's basketball coaches
Appalachian State Mountaineers men's basketball coaches
College men's basketball head coaches in the United States
High school basketball coaches in the United States
North Alabama Lions men's basketball coaches
Sterling Warriors baseball players
Sterling Warriors men's basketball players
VCU Rams men's basketball coaches
Wyoming Cowboys basketball coaches
Year of birth missing (living people)